is a Japanese professional basketball player and the assistant coach of the Hiroshima Dragonflies in the Japanese B.League.

Head coaching record

 
|-
| style="text-align:left;"|Hiroshima Dragonflies
| style="text-align:left;"|2017-18
|43||25||18|||| style="text-align:center;"|3rd in B2 Western|||-||-||-||
| style="text-align:center;"|-
|-
|-

References

1981 births
Living people
Hiroshima Dragonflies coaches
Hiroshima Dragonflies players

Japanese basketball coaches
Levanga Hokkaido players
Nagoya Diamond Dolphins players
San-en NeoPhoenix players
SeaHorses Mikawa players
Sun Rockers Shibuya players